Nyctimystes nullicedens is a species of tree frog in the subfamily Pelodryadinae. It is endemic to Papua New Guinea and has been found on the south-western side of Mount Obree, at 550 meters above sea level.

Taxonomy
This species is related to the northern New Guinea tree frog.

Description
Nyctimystes nullicedens has green pigmentation on the mucosa of its mouth.

References

Frogs of Asia
Amphibians described in 2018
nullicedens